The Arrondissement of Ostend is one of the eight administrative arrondissements in the Province of West Flanders, Belgium.

The Administrative Arrondissement of Ostend consists of the following municipalities:
 Bredene
 De Haan
 Gistel
 Ichtegem
 Middelkerke
 Ostend
 Oudenburg

References

Ostend